Gregorio Carafa, C.R. (1588–1675) was a Roman Catholic prelate who served as Archbishop of Salerno (1664–1675) and Bishop of Cassano all'Jonio (1648–1664).

Biography
Gregorio Carafa was born in 1588 in Naples, Italy and ordained a priest in the Congregation of Clerics Regular of the Divine Providence.
On 24 Aug 1648, he was appointed during the papacy of Pope Innocent X as Bishop of Cassano all'Jonio.
On 20 Sep 1648, he was consecrated bishop by Pier Luigi Carafa (seniore), Cardinal-Priest of Santi Silvestro e Martino ai Monti, with Fausto Caffarelli (archbishop), Archbishop of Santa Severina, and Ranuccio Scotti Douglas, Bishop of Borgo San Donnino, serving as co-consecrators. 
On 14 Feb 1664, he was selected as Archbishop of Salerno and confirmed by Pope Alexander VII on 23 Jun 1664.
He served as Archbishop of Salerno until his death on 22 Feb 1675.

References

External links and additional sources
 (for Chronology of Bishops) 
 (for Chronology of Bishops) 
 (for Chronology of Bishops) 
 (for Chronology of Bishops) 

17th-century Italian Roman Catholic archbishops
Bishops appointed by Pope Innocent X
Bishops appointed by Pope Alexander VII
1588 births
1675 deaths
Clergy from Naples
Theatine bishops